The Cross Keys is a Grade II listed pub in Totternhoe, Bedfordshire, England
It is a 17th-century thatched building and the first floor is timber-framed.

Interior
The interior is largely unaltered since the 1930s, and is on CAMRA'S Regional Inventory of Historic Pub Interiors for East Anglia.

References

Grade II listed pubs in Bedfordshire
Thatched buildings in England
Timber framed pubs in England
Pubs in Bedfordshire